Sheffield Park was a Parliamentary constituency in the City of Sheffield, England. The constituency was created in 1918 and abolished in 1983. The area formerly covered by this constituency is now mostly in the Sheffield Central constituency.

Boundaries
1918–1950: The County Borough of Sheffield wards of Heeley and Park.

1950–1955:  The County Borough of Sheffield wards of Manor, Moor, Park, and Sharrow.

1955–1974: The County Borough of Sheffield wards of Burngreave, Manor, Moor, and Park.

1974–1983: The County Borough of Sheffield wards of Burngreave, Castle, Manor, Park, and Sharrow.

Members of Parliament

Election results

Elections in the 1970s

Elections in the 1960s

Elections in the 1950s

Elections in the 1940s

In the 1942 by-election, Thomas Burden was elected unopposed.

Elections in the 1930s

Elections in the 1920s

Elections in the 1910s

References

Sources

http://www.psr.keele.ac.uk/  (Election results from 1951 to the present)
F. W. S. Craig, British Parliamentary Election Results 1918 - 1949
F. W. S. Craig, British Parliamentary Election Results 1950 - 1970
Sheffield General Election Results 1945 - 2001, Sheffield City Council

Park
Constituencies of the Parliament of the United Kingdom established in 1918
Constituencies of the Parliament of the United Kingdom disestablished in 1983